Julie Goodnight is a horse trainer and clinician.

Julie Goodnight is a multidisciplinary rider and clinician, with experience in dressage, jumping, racing, reining, colt-starting, cutting, and wilderness riding. She teaches other riders through her Clinic Tour and through her television show  Horse Master With Julie Goodnight. She also does clinics at expos and has many DVDs for horse training and riding. Goodnight travels the world teaching natural horsemanship, emphasizing doing what is best for the horse, and also the rider's safety.

She was influenced by ex-Cavalry instructors who were multidisciplinary riders.

References

External links
Facebook
Certified Horsemanship Association
Horse Master with Julie Goodnight

Year of birth missing (living people)
Place of birth missing (living people)
Living people
California State University, Northridge alumni